Ayat-sur-Sioule is a commune in the Puy-de-Dôme department in Auvergne-Rhône-Alpes in central France. French Revolutionary General Louis Desaix was born in Ayat-sur-Sioule in 1768 and is considered to be one of the best Generals of the Revolution.

Population

See also
 Communes of the Puy-de-Dôme department

References

Communes of Puy-de-Dôme